Zapropoulos is a Greek surname. Notable people with the surname include:

Giannis Zapropoulos (born 1982), Greek footballer
Nikos Zapropoulos (born 1978), Greek footballer

Greek-language surnames